The Laurel Award for TV Writing Achievement is an honorary award presented by the Writers Guild of America for the greatest achievement in television writing. Along with the Laurel Award for Screenwriting Achievement, it is one of two lifetime achievement awards rewarded each year at the Writers Guild of America Awards.

Winners

External links
Official site with list of past recipients

Writers Guild of America Awards
Lifetime achievement awards